Presidential elections were held in Austria on 5 May 1957. There were only two candidates, with Adolf Schärf of the Socialist Party winning with 51% of the vote. Voter turnout was 97%.

Results

References

Presidential elections in Austria
President
Austria
Austria